Alton Henry Maddox Jr. (born July 21, 1945) is an American lawyer who was involved in several high-profile civil rights cases in the 1980s.

Education
Maddox was born in Inkster, Michigan and grew up in Newnan, Georgia. He began practicing law in 1976, after graduating from Howard University (BA, 1967) and Boston College Law School (JD, 1971).

Clients
Maddox represented several alleged victims including the family of Michael Stewart, a Brooklyn man who died while in custody of the New York City Transit Police. Six officers were indicted for the death; all were found not guilty. Rudy Giuliani, then US Attorney in Manhattan, found insufficient evidence to warrant a federal grand jury investigation. A Metropolitan Transportation Authority report later faulted police for use of excessive force.

He was the attorney for Cedric Sandiford and the family of manslaughter victim Michael Griffith in the Howard Beach incident. Maddox and other lawyers demanded a special prosecutor be appointed to the case, and the request was eventually granted. Maddox accused the New York City Police Department and Commissioner Benjamin Ward of a cover-up.

He represented Tawana Brawley during the period of her rape allegations. Maddox and two other Brawley advisers accused Assistant District Attorney Steven Pagones of abducting and raping Brawley. A grand jury did not charge Pagones.

The family of murder victim Yusuf Hawkins in the Bensonhurst incident was also one of Maddox's clients. 

Maddox has represented many defendants, including Michael Briscoe, arrested during the investigation into the alleged rape of the Central Park jogger. Briscoe was found innocent in that case. 

In 1984, Maddox was arrested and charged with obstruction of justice after a courtroom melee in which he and his client Willie Bosket were confronted by court officers.

Maddox was the defense lawyer for one of the two men hired by Marla Hanson's landlord to mutilate and disfigure her. Maddox challenged Hanson's character during the trial.  This led New York State Assemblyman Dov Hikind to ask a grievance committee "to investigate the professional behavior of Mr. Maddox."  Maddox responded, It's my job to question the character of Mr. Bowman. Law professor Stephen Gillers of New York University Law School said, "There's nothing unethical about what he is reported to have done."

Maddox also represented Al Sharpton when Sharpton faced a 67-count indictment alleging fraud and theft. Sharpton was acquitted of all charges.

Disciplinary actions
In 1990, Maddox was indefinitely suspended by the Appellate Division of the State Supreme Court in Brooklyn after failing to appear before a disciplinary hearing to answer allegations regarding his conduct in the Brawley case.

In 1996, Maddox was ordered to pay New York State $1,000 in legal costs for filing a false complaint of racial bias. He had alleged that he had had to apply to represent an indigent defendant in a murder case, while two lawyers who were white had been appointed to represent the other defendant in the case without having to apply. The state showed evidence that in fact, the two lawyers had applied and Maddox had filed a discrimination suit instead of going through the applications process. Michael Mukasey, at that time a Federal judge, ordered Maddox to pay New York State the legal costs it had incurred defending against the suit.

The following year, in 1997, Maddox and his group, the United African Movement, were fined $10,000 by New York City's Commission on Human Rights after they denied a white teacher access to a speech by Cornel West on the basis of her race.

Other activities
Maddox is a former Director of the National Conference of Black Lawyers Juvenile Defense Project. He is also the founder of the Center for Law & Social Justice at Medgar Evers College and co-sponsored the 1983 Congressional hearings on Police Brutality in New York City. A 2006 resolution passed by the Council of the City of New York supported Maddox's reinstatement, but the New York State Attorney General's office has not acted on this request.

Maddox often contributes to publications such as Amsterdam News and is a frequent guest on WLIB radio's Sharp Talk program, hosted by Sharpton. He has also given speeches at several colleges and rallies. His 1995 speech prior to the Million Man March was criticized by commentators and the Anti-Defamation League for its support of a Louis Farrakhan quote characterizing Jews as "bloodsuckers".

Personal life
He was married to Leola W. Maddox, who died in 2017. They had a son.

References

1945 births
Living people
African-American lawyers
People from Newnan, Georgia
20th-century American lawyers
21st-century American lawyers
Howard University alumni
Boston College Law School alumni
New York (state) lawyers
People from Inkster, Michigan
20th-century African-American people
21st-century African-American people